António Augusto Carvalho Castela (born 26 October 1928) is a former Portuguese footballer who played as midfielder.

Football career 

Castela gained 4 caps for Portugal and made his debut 23 November 1952 in Porto against Austria, in a 1-1 draw.

External links 
 
 
 

1928 births
Portuguese footballers
Association football midfielders
Primeira Liga players
C.F. Os Belenenses players
Portugal international footballers
Living people